Sanja Tomašević (born June 3, 1980) is a Serbian-American retired volleyball player and was the head coach of Arizona State women's volleyball team from 2017–2022.

Personal life
Tomašević is a native of Serbia. She obtained her U.S. nationality in March 2021.

Playing career
Tomašević played professional volleyball in Serbia before joining the University of Washington Huskies volleyball team. At the end of her career, she was a two-time All-American and the 2005 Asics and CVU.com National Player of the Year. She led the Huskies to four NCAA tournament appearances, including the 2005 NCAA national championship, and two Pac-10 conference titles. Additionally, she was named the conference Player of the Year in 2005. She ended her collegiate career as Washington's all-time leader in points (2,159.5), kills (1,795) and service aces (156). She is one of only five players in Huskies history to record 1,000 kills and 1,000 digs. She graduated from Washington in 2006 with a degree in communications.

In October of 2016, Tomašević became just the second individual volleyball player to be inducted into the Husky Hall of Fame.

Following her playing career at Washington, she played professional volleyball in several countries including Greece, Puerto Rico, Italy, Azerbaijan, and Switzerland.

Coaching career
Tomašević began collegiate coaching at University of Texas-San Antonio in 2012. In her first season as the assistant coach/recruiting coordinator, she helped the Roadrunners to a 21-9 overall record and a 13-5 mark in the Western Athletic Conference. UTSA, which tied for second in the league standings, advanced to the WAC Tournament semifinals.

After spending two season at UTSA, she was named the assistant coach for the Miami Hurricane's women's volleyball team in 2014. She helped the Hurricanes reach the NCAA Tournament for the sixth consecutive season in 2014. The Hurricanes, who finished the season 22-9, reached the second round of the NCAA Tournament before falling to No. 8 Florida in four sets. She was also credited with the development of All-Americans and All-Conference players on the team.

Prior to being named head coach of Arizona State in December 2016, she served as a recruiting coordinator and interim head coach for the team.

Following the conclusion of the 2022 season, Arizona State announced that per mutual agreement, Tomašević stepped down as the head coach.

Head coaching record

External links
Volleybox Player profile

References

1980 births
Living people
Serbian women's volleyball players
Serbian expatriate sportspeople in Switzerland
Serbian expatriate sportspeople in Greece
Serbian expatriate sportspeople in Azerbaijan
Serbian expatriate sportspeople in Italy
Arizona State Sun Devils women's volleyball coaches
Miami Hurricanes women's volleyball coaches
UTSA Roadrunners women's volleyball coaches
Washington Huskies women's volleyball players
American volleyball coaches
Serbian expatriate sportspeople in South Korea
Expatriate volleyball players in Italy
Expatriate volleyball players in Azerbaijan
Expatriate volleyball players in Greece
Expatriate volleyball players in Switzerland
Expatriate volleyball players in South Korea
Serbian volleyball coaches